Nelson "Red" Long (September 28, 1876 – August 11, 1929) was a Major League Baseball pitcher. He played for the Boston Beaneaters of the National League in one game on September 11, 1902.

External links

1876 births
1929 deaths
Boston Beaneaters players
Canadian expatriate baseball players in the United States
Major League Baseball pitchers
Major League Baseball players from Canada
Port Huron Tunnelites players
Lawrence Colts players
Haverhill Hustlers players
New Castle Outlaws players
Johnstown Johnnies players
York White Rozes players
Reading Pretzels players